MS Island Sky is a 118 berth cruise ship owned and operated by London-based cruise company Noble Caledonia. On 19 July 2021 it became the first cruise ship to visit Scotland since the onset of the COVID-19 pandemic in that country, and after the Scottish Government moved Scotland into the lowest level of COVID restrictions which included the reopening of seaports. As part of a UK coastal cruise, the ship arrived at Lerwick Harbour in Shetland, where it docked at Victoria Pier. The boat had 66 passengers on board, roughly half its capacity.

References

Cruise ships
COVID-19 pandemic in Scotland